Zhao Qinan (born 10 May 1994) is a Chinese ice hockey player and member of the Chinese national ice hockey team. She most recently played with the KRS Vanke Rays in the 2021–22 season of the Zhenskaya Hockey League (ZhHL) and previously played in the Canadian Women's Hockey League (CWHL) with the Vanke Rays in the 2017–18 season and the Shenzhen KRS Vanke Rays in the 2018–19 season.

Zhao represented China in the women's ice hockey tournament at the 2022 Winter Olympics in Beijing.

References

External links
 
 

1997 births
Living people
Asian Games medalists in ice hockey
Asian Games silver medalists for China
Chinese women's ice hockey defencemen
Competitors at the 2015 Winter Universiade
Competitors at the 2017 Winter Universiade
Ice hockey players at the 2017 Asian Winter Games
Ice hockey players at the 2022 Winter Olympics
Medalists at the 2017 Asian Winter Games
Olympic ice hockey players of China
Shenzhen KRS Vanke Rays players
Sportspeople from Harbin
Vanke Rays players